Creedmore is a historic home located at Mountain Lake Park, Garrett County, Maryland, United States. It is a large -story frame house built in the Queen Anne style. The house was built in 1903–1904 and has many distinctive architectural features, including oval windows, an unusual roofline, and an extensive use of shingling. It was constructed originally as a summer residence.

Creedmore was listed on the National Register of Historic Places in 1984.

References

External links
, including photo from 1983, at Maryland Historical Trust

Houses in Garrett County, Maryland
Houses on the National Register of Historic Places in Maryland
Houses completed in 1903
Queen Anne architecture in Maryland
National Register of Historic Places in Garrett County, Maryland